Palaeosiccia punctata is a moth of the  subfamily Arctiinae. It is found in the Democratic Republic of Congo, Kenya and Sierra Leone.

References

Lithosiini